Offutt is a surname. Notable people with the surname include:

Andrew J. Offutt, American science-fiction and fantasy author
Chris Offutt, American author of fiction and memoirs
Denton Offutt, 19th century general store operator who gave Abraham Lincoln his first job
Jarvis Offutt, Aviator from World War I
Jeff Offutt, American university professor of Software Engineering
Michael Offutt, American machine designer
Ronald D. Offutt, Founder of R. D. Offutt Company, a 9-state 190,000-acre farm
Warren Offutt, American astronomer

References